Komuna (full legal name: Komuna-International mešovito preduzeće za unutrašnju i spoljnu trgovinu d.o.o. Beograd) is a Serbian record label and media production company. Established in 1985, its headquarters are in Belgrade, Serbia with a branch office Budva, Montenegro. Registered in the Belgrade municipality of Rakovica, the company is owned by Maksa Ćatović.

Film and television production
The main scope of Komuna involves audiovisual productions: films, television programs, commercials, live transmissions and music videos. Komuna delivers full support and assistance to foreign production companies interested in shooting in former Yugoslavia and Bulgaria.

Komuna was involved in production films like Savior by Predrag Antonijević, Underground and Black Cat, White Cat by Emir Kusturica, Normal People by Oleg Novković, Barking at the Stars by Zdravko Šotra, The Red Colored Grey Truck by Srđan Koljević, and others. In realization of these films Komuna co-operated with production companies from the United States (Savior), as well as companies from Germany and France (Underground, Black Cat, White Cat, Normal People and The Red Colored Grey Truck).

From the very beginning Komuna has provided a wide range of services to the Radio Television of Serbia. With RTS, Komuna produced popular TV series like Porodično blago (62 episodes), Stižu dolari (52 episodes), Svaštara Duška Radovića (13 episodes), Lisice (18 episodes) and Neki novi klinci (15 episodes).

Record publishing
Some of the artist that have been signed to the label include:
Amajlija
Apsolutno Romantično
Dragana Mirković
Bajaga i Instruktori
Goran Bregović
Gru
Dejan Cukić & Spori Ritam Band
Zdravko Čolić
Nikola Čuturilo
Familija
Instant Karma
Jugosloveni
Aleksandra Kovač
Kornelije Kovač
Laboratorija Zvuka
Love Hunters
Oliver Mandić
Piloti
Laza Ristovski & Aleksandar Lokner
Rambo Amadeus
Rambo Amadeus & Goran Vejvoda
Smak
Sunshine
S Vremena Na Vreme
Vampiri

References

External links
Official website
Komuna at The Internet Movie Database
Komuna at Discogs

Serbian record labels
Rock record labels
Pop record labels
Serbian rock music
Serbian brands